Kuybyshev Reservoir or Kuybyshevskoye Reservoir, sometimes called Samara Reservoir and informally called Kuybyshev Sea, is a reservoir of the middle Volga and lower Kama in Chuvashia, Mari El Republic, Republic of Tatarstan, Samara Oblast and Ulyanovsk Oblast, Russia. The Kuybyshev Reservoir has a surface area of 6,450 km² and a volume of 58 billion cubic meters. It is the largest reservoir in Europe and third in the world by surface area. The major cities of Kazan, Ulyanovsk, and Tolyatti are adjacent to the reservoir.

The reservoir was created by the dam of Zhiguli Hydroelectric Station (formerly, V.I. Lenin Volga Hydroelectric Station), located between the cities of Zhigulevsk and Tolyatti in Samara Oblast. It was filled in 1955–1957. 

With the filling of the reservoir in the 1950s, some villages and towns were submerged by the rising water and were rebuilt on higher ground. These included the old fortress town of Stavropol-on-Volga, which was replaced by Tolyatti. One district of Ulyanovsk is below water level and is protected from the reservoir by an embankment.

See also
Markiz Island

References

Reservoirs built in the Soviet Union
Reservoirs in Russia
Reservoirs in Mari El
Reservoirs in Chuvashia
Reservoirs in Samara Oblast
Reservoirs in Ulyanovsk Oblast
Reservoirs in Tatarstan
RKuybyshev
RKuybyshev